There are at least 36 named trails in Meagher County, Montana according to the U.S. Geological Survey, Board of Geographic Names.  A trail is defined as: "Route for passage from one point to another; does not include roads or highways (jeep trail, path, ski trail)."

 Arkansas Traveller Ski Trail, el.  
 Big Seven Ski Trail, el.  
 Black Diamond Ski Trail, el.  
 Brown-eyed Queen Ski Trail, el.  
 Compromise Pass Ski Trail, el.  
 Cumberland Ski Trail, el.  
 Deep Creek Figure 8 Loop National Recreation Trail, el.  
 Dynamite Ski Trail, el.  
 Frisco Ski Trail, el.  
 Geronimo Ski Trail, el.  
 Glory Hole Ski Trail, el.  
 Golden Goose Ski Trail, el.  
 Good Luck Ski Trail, el.  
 Gun Barrel Ski Trail, el.  
 James Bond Ski Trail, el.  
 Jamison Trail, el.  
 Last Chance Gulch Ski Trail, el.  
 Mizpah Race Hill Ski Trail, el.  
 Mizpah Ski Trail, el.  
 Moly Ski Trail, el.  
 Muley Ski Trail, el.  
 Pan Handle Ski Trail, el.  
 Pay Dirt Ski Trail, el.  
 Prentice Ski Trail, el.  
 Quicksilver Lower Ski Trail, el.  
 Quicksilver Upper Ski Trail, el.  
 Ripley Lower Ski Trail, el.  
 Ripley Upper Ski Trail, el.  
 Ruby Gulch Ski Trail, el.  
 Ruby Ski Trail, el.  
 Second Thought Ski Trail, el.  
 Silverhorn Ski Trail, el.  
 Sluice Box Ski Trail, el.  
 Sour Dough Hill Ski Trail, el.  
 Speculation Ski Trail, el.  
 Yogo Ski Trail, el.

Further reading

See also
 List of trails of Montana
 Trails of Yellowstone National Park

Notes

Geography of Meagher County, Montana
 Meagher County
Transportation in Meagher County, Montana